The Law Brook or Postford Brook is a stream in the Surrey Hills AONB which feeds the Tillingbourne which in turn feeds the River Wey. It is notable in its own right chiefly for its industrial vestiges and records.

Course
It mainly rises in the former manor farms and common land of Peaslake on the northern slopes of the Greensand Ridge. It drains much of the northern Winterfold Forest/Hurtwood: the upper half of the drainage basin is forest with some pasture save for the large hamlet itself. The stream waters the clustered village of Brook/Little London in Albury. On the left bank the stream has, after its coalescence of headwaters, the northern lands of Farley Green (the secondary village in Albury parish) then briefly a low corner of Blackheath, Wonersh – a sparsely-inhabited wooded plateau, on the opposite bank of the closest-to-village fields of Albury's main settlement, including a further former millhouse.

The last  demarcates the land (parish) of Albury from St Martha, centred on Chilworth. It and the Tillingbourne were harnessed by digging leats (narrow cuts) and mill ponds for industrial mills – the Royal Gunpowder Mills, a long leat dividing Chilworth and supplying its largest pond, known today as The Fish Pond.

The North Downs Line follows a distant right bank of the Brook for  along the width of Albury's essentially rectangular parish.

References

Rivers of Surrey
2Law